Stylulus is a genus of ground beetles in the family Carabidae. There are at least three described species in Stylulus.

Species
These three species belong to the genus Stylulus:
 Stylulus isabelae Giachino & Sciaky, 2003  (the Lesser Antilles)
 Stylulus nasutus L.Schaufuss, 1882  (the Caribbean Sea)
 Stylulus plaumanni (Jeannel, 1963)  (South America)

References

Trechinae